(1106 – 20 June 1180) was a prominent Japanese poet whose works appeared in various anthologies. He served eight different emperors in his long career, holding posts such as hyōgo no kami (head of the arsenal). He was also a warrior, leading the Minamoto armies at the beginning of the Genpei War.

In the clashes between the Minamoto and Taira clans that had gone on for decades, Yorimasa had tried to stay out of politics, and avoided taking sides. He did participate in the Hōgen rebellion in 1156. For a time, he was even friends with Taira no Kiyomori. During the Heiji Rebellion of 1160, he leaned just enough in favor of the Taira that it allowed them to overthrow the Minamoto. However, by the time he officially retired from military service in Kiyomori's army in 1179, Yorimasa had changed his mind about opposing his own clan. He entered the Buddhist priesthood. In May 1180, he sent out an appeal to other Minamoto leaders, and to temples and monasteries that Kiyomori had offended.

In the Genpei War, which began with the Battle of Uji in 1180, Yorimasa led Minamoto forces, along with warrior monks from Mii-dera, in defending Byōdō-in. Despite the monks' having torn up the planks of the bridge leading to the temple, the Taira managed to break through the defenses, and take the temple. Suffering defeat at Uji, he committed suicide at Byōdō-in. Minamoto no Yorimasa's ritual suicide by seppuku may be the earliest recorded instance of a samurai's suicide in the face of defeat, although Minamoto no Tametomo, who died in 1170, ten years before Yorimasa, may hold this distinction.

According to legend, after his death a retainer took Yorimasa's head to prevent it from falling into the hands of the Taira. He then fastened it to a rock and threw it into the Uji River so it could not be found.

Yorimasa's daughter was the poet Nijōin no Sanuki.

Yorisama's son was Minamoto no Nakatsuna.

Poetry
In a famous episode in the Taiheiki:

Samidare ni sawabe no makomo mizu koete/izure ayame to hikizo wazurau

The fifth-month rains swamp the water-oats along the shore,
making it hard to tell irises from one another and pull
just one

"So, Yorimasa not only added to his reputation as an archer by shooting down a nue; he also proved himself a distinguished poet by winning with a single poem Lady Ayame, whom he had adored for years and months."

Yorimasa's death poem was:

umoregi no/hana saku koto mo/nakarishi ni/mi no naru hate zo/kanashikarikeru

Like a fossil tree
From which we gather no flowers
Sad has been my life
Fated no fruit to produce

See also 
 Seiwa Genji

References

External links 
 

Minamoto clan
Suicides by seppuku
1106 births
1180 deaths
People of Heian-period Japan
Heian period Buddhist clergy
12th-century Japanese poets
Deified Japanese people
Date of birth unknown